William G. E. Cooper (born 1917) was an English professional footballer who played as a centre forward.

Career
Born in York, Cooper played for Halifax Town, Bradford City and Rochdale. For Bradford City he made 7 appearances in the Football League, scoring 4 goals.

Sources

References

1917 births
Year of death missing
English footballers
Halifax Town A.F.C. players
Bradford City A.F.C. players
Rochdale A.F.C. players
English Football League players
Association football forwards